SS Fatshan was a passenger ferry steamer which sank in stormy seas off Lantau Island during Typhoon Rose resulting in the loss of 88 lives.

Construction and commissioning 

Fatshan was ordered by the China Navigation Company as a replacement for the previous  to take up its relevant duties on the ferry service between Hong Kong and Canton after 45 years of service.

The ship was built at the Taikoo Dockyard's lot 262 by the Taikoo Dockyard and Engineering Company, delivered to China Navigation Company in 1933. She was powered by a four-cylinder triple expansion steam engine producing 71 nhp and displacing 2,639 gross register tons.

Hong Kong Canton route with the China Navigation Company 

In December 1939, Fatshan was underway under the command of Captain Whyte en route to Canton from Hong Kong when the steamer struck a submerged object which tore a large hole into the ship's hull near the engine room. Captain Whyte managed to beach the steamer on nearby Japanese-occupied Lin Tin Island, avoiding its sinking. A passing British warship,  of the China Station came to the ship's rescue, transferring around 1,800 passengers and their baggage onto the gunboat. The passengers were later transferred from the warship onto  of the HongKong Canton & Macao Steamboat Company.

In August 1940, Fatshan was detained by Japanese authorities over Swire's refusal to pay piloting fees. The detention led to a brief diplomatic incident between British and Japanese colonial authorities before the ship was finally released in April 1941.

In December 1941, Fatshan was captured by the Imperial Japanese Army after their victory in the Battle of Hong Kong and renamed as Nankai-201.

Japanese service 

During Japanese rule of Hong Kong and until around 1942, Nankai-201 continued operating as a ferry service between Hong Kong and Canton, likely with the Inland River Operations Company. In 1942, the ship was renamed as Koto Maru and began carrying out duties including troop and supply transport in the region for the Imperial Japanese Navy.

On 9 August 1944, Koto Maru was spotted and reported on by agents of the British Army Aid Group as part of their Naval Section's Kweilin Intelligence Summary No. 70. The ship was recorded as having arrived at Hong Kong around 18 July from Canton and had been laid up for repairs at the Taikoo Dockyard for repairs to its stern, hull, propeller and rudder for discharge on around 1 September. The vessel was recorded as having a light grey color scheme with armament modifications including an anti-aircraft machine gun on the bridge and was crewed by 4 Japanese, 30 Chinese and 6 Indian sailors.

An earlier sketch of Koto Maru from September 1944 indicated that there was no significant changes to the ship's peacetime configuration aside from the color scheme and light armament.

Resumed Hong Kong Canton route with the China Navigation Company 

In August 1945 with the reestablishment of British rule in Hong Kong, Fatshan was returned to the China Navigation Company.

In January 1949, Fatshan participated in the opening of the Pearl River's Elliot Passage carrying the British delegation to officiate the ceremony. In May 1950, the Communist government passed legislation barring foreign vessels from calling at Canton. As a result, Fatshan was moved to the Hong Kong Macao route.

Hong Kong Macao route with the Man On Shipping and Navigation Company 

In May 1951, Fatshan was acquired by Sir Tsun-Nin Chau for the Man On Shipping and Navigation Company. At the time, Fatshan was one of the main ferry boats operating the Hong Kong to Macao route, the others being MV Tai Loy and SS Tak Shing.

Hong Kong Macao route with the Yu On Shipping Company 

In July 1951, Fatshan was acquired from Man On by the newly formed Yu On Shipping Company (裕安輪船). Yu On had been founded in that same year by Yuen-Cheong Liang, Ho Yin and Ho Tim. YC Liang had previously made use of Fatshan in 1945 when he was charged with ferrying relief supplies to Hong Kong from Macao after the end of World War II.

By 1961, competing ferry services on the Hong Kong to Macao route were set up with the establishment of Stanley Ho's Shun Tak Shipping. The competition for the route further escalated in the mid to late 60's with the introduction of hydrofoil ferry services.

Hong Kong Macao route with the Tai Tak Hing Shipping Company 

In 1968, Stanley Ho's Tai Tak Hing Shipping Company, a Shun Tak subsidiary, acquired Fatshan together with SS Tai Loi from Yu On and continued sailing the vessel on the Hong Kong Macao route.

Sinking 

On 16 August 1971, Fatshan was sailing with a complement of 92 passengers and crew when she was caught in a severe storm brought about by Typhoon Rose. The vessel was forced to anchor off Stonecutters Island due to the heavy winds. Only four people survived the sinking of Fatshan and the wreck was not discovered until the tide went out and a passing ship found floating bodies.

Salvage rights were sold to Lai Man Yau in September 1971 and operations to raise Fatshan took place over the course of around three months following the disaster.

See also 
 Shun Tak Holdings

References 

1933 ships
Troop ships
Troop ships of Japan
Ships built in Hong Kong
Ships of the Imperial Japanese Navy
World War II naval ships of Japan
Ships of Hong Kong
Shipwrecks of Hong Kong
Cargo ships of Japan
Maritime incidents in 1971
Steamships of Hong Kong
World War II merchant ships of Hong Kong
Ships built by the Taikoo Dockyard and Engineering Company